Lellouche is a North-African surname; a variant form of Lellouch, Lelouch, Alloush, Allouch and Allouche. It is derived from the early Afroasiatic-Semitic family, where it is seen in the Berber and Arabian Peninsula Arabic cultures as el allouch (alush), meaning "the lamb".  It is most-often used to signify a young male lamb, and remains a nickname or term of endearment in some North African and Arabic cultures. 

Louche also means "cross-eyed" in French, and le/la Louche serves as nickname in its figurative meaning, a "shady" one, for some historical people in French texts. 

Notable people with the name include:

People and places named Allouch

People named Allouch 
  (born 1939), French psychoanalyst.
 Moustapha Allouch (born 1958), Lebanese politician.
 Roula Allouch, Wisconsin born American with Syrian descent, chairwoman of the Council on American–Islamic Relations.
 Soulaïman Allouch (born 2002), Moroccan-Dutch footballer.

Places named Allouch 
 Dar Allouch, a town in Nabeul Governorate, Tunisia.

People named Allouche 
 Adam Allouche (born 1993), French–Lebanese award winning international swimmer.
  (born 1956), French bridge player.
 Fabrice Allouche (born 1968), French professional boxer;
  (born 1939), French politician.
  (active 2004–now), French composer, pianist and music producer.
  (born 1953), mathematician, research director at CNRS.
  (born 20th century), French psychosociologist;

People named Alloush 

 Fadi Alloush (born 1969), Lebanese footballer.
 Kinda Alloush  (born 1982), Syrian actress.
 Zahran Alloush (1971-2015), Syrian rebel.

People named Lelouch

Claude Lelouch and relatives 
 Claude Lelouch (born 1937), French film director, writer, cinematographer, actor and producer. He has 7 known children, 4 of them being active in film industry as either producers or actors.
 Marie-Sophie L., Claude's ex-wife, French actress, raw foodism advocate.
  née Cochet (born 1963), Claude's ex-wife, French actress.
  (born 1983), Claude's daughter with Christine, French actress.
  (born 1976), Claude's daughter with Christine, TV presenter and producer.
 Shaya Lelouch (born 1992) Claude's daughter with Christine, French actress.
  (born 1969), Claude's son with Christine, French actor, director, screenwriter.
 Martine Lelouch, Claude's sister, French actress, photographer and videographer.

Other people named Lelouch 
 Émilie Lelouch, French actress, stunt woman.

Fictional people named Lelouch 
Lelouch Lamperouge, anime character from Code Geass

People named Lellouch 
 Emmanuel Lellouch (born 1963), Observatoire de Paris planetary scientist.
 5519 Lellouch, a minor planet, named after Emmanuel Lellouch.

People named Lellouche 
  (born 1981), French poker player.
 Camille Lellouche (born 1986), French actress, comedian and singer.
 Élie Lellouche (born 1952), French trainer of thoroughbred race horses.
 Gilles Lellouche (born 1972), French actor, Philippe Lellouche's brother.
 Ofer Lellouche (born 1947), Israeli artist.
 Pierre Lellouche (born 1951), French politician.
 Philippe Lellouche (born 1966), French actor, Gilles Lellouche's brother.
  (20th century), French director.

Others 
 Bernard I (died 995), Count of Armagnac.
 Vassili (1421–1448), Grand Prince of Muscovy.

References 

Surnames of Algerian origin
Arabic-language surnames
Jewish surnames